Richard Reicheg (May 26, 1937 – July 30, 2021) was an American television, stage, and film actor, musician and a Grammy-nominated songwriter. His career spanned a period of over sixty years.

Reicheg wrote the song “For The Sake Of The Children” that is featured in the Robert Altman film  Nashville and for which he received a Grammy nomination in 1975.

His songs have been recorded and performed by many top artists, including The Persuasions, Maria Muldaur, Gary Wright, and Jay and the Americans. His song "Everybody's a Masterpiece" was recorded by Three Dog Night. Reicheg's "Looking for an Echo" was recorded by Kenny Vance, The Persuasions (on their album Chirpin'), and by others.  The song was also the musical theme of the Martin Davidson film of the same name. Film historian Jan Stewart has called Reicheg's song "For the Sake of the Children" an "ode to marital fidelity [that is] a delicious postmodern balancing act of send up and the real McCoy."

Early years 
Reicheg was born and raised in the Crown Heights section of Brooklyn in the shadow of Ebbets Field. After graduating from Erasmus Hall High School, he served in the U.S. Army, stationed in Germany from 1956 to 1958. Upon discharge, he attended Brooklyn College, received a B.A. and M.A. degree in speech and theater, and acted in college productions. There he learned to play guitar and joined the burgeoning folk music scene in Greenwich Village. In various folk groups and as a solo performer, he toured extensively, playing coffee houses, cabarets and clubs in the U.S. and Canada, including The Bitter End, Gerde’s Folk City, The Blue Angel and The Troubadour. He was a featured performer at the 1964 New York World's Fair, and part of The American Hootenany Festival that toured colleges throughout the US. During those years he recorded for Laurie, 20th Century Fox (as Lenny and Dick) and Decca records (as Sunrise Highway).

Personal life 
Prior to his death, Reicheg lived in Los Angeles, California with his wife Julie Payne. He died on July 30, 2021, at the age of 84.

Filmography

Film

Television

Theater

References 

1937 births
2021 deaths
People from Crown Heights, Brooklyn
Male actors from New York City
American male singer-songwriters
Erasmus Hall High School alumni
Musicians from Brooklyn
Singer-songwriters from New York (state)
Brooklyn College alumni